Abu al-Fadl Muhammad bin Tahir bin Ali bin Ahmad al-Shaibani al-Maqdisi (c. 1057-1113), commonly known as Ibn Tahir of Caesarea ("Ibn Tahir al-Qaisarani" in Arabic), was a Muslim historian and traditionist. He is largely credited with being the first to delineate and define the six canonical works of Sunni Islam after the Qur'an, and the first person to include Sunan ibn Majah as a canonical work.

Biography
Ibn al-Qaisarani was born in Jerusalem in about 1057 to an Arab family originally from Caesarea, hence his name. Because of the Arabic name for Jerusalem being "Bait al-Maqdis," he was often nicknamed "Maqdisi" or the man from Jerusalem instead. His birth date is recorded by Ibn Khallikan as 6 Shawwal in 448 on the Islamic calendar, which William McGuckin de Slane reckoned as December 1056 on the Gregorian calendar.

Ibn al-Qaisarani traveled extensively in search of hadith, or narrations and reports, from the Muslim prophet Muhammad. He began learning hadith at the age of twelve and moved to Baghdad at the age of nineteen; after spending some time in Iraq, he returned to his hometown briefly before proceeding to perform the Muslim pilgrimage at Mecca. Eventually, he would travel and study throughout the Tihamah, the Hijaz, Syria, Egypt, Mesopotamia, Persia and Khorasan. He spent much of his life in Hamedan, in present-day Iran, where he wrote a number of respected works in his chosen field of study and gained wide renown for his scholarship and contributions. During his time in the East, he was a student of Khwaja Abdullah Ansari, and worked as a paid copyist for his hand-written editions of the collections of Muhammad al-Bukhari, Muslim ibn al-Hajjaj, Abu Dawood and Ibn Majah.

Ibn al-Qaisarani died in Baghdad on a Friday while returning from another pilgrimage at Mecca, which he had performed multiple times during his life. Ibn Khallikan records the date as 28 Rabi al-awwal in the Hijri year 507, reckoned by de Slane as September 1113 Gregorian.

Works
Ibn al-Qaisarani is widely regarded as the first person to index the six canonical books of Sunni tradition: Sahih al-Bukhari, Sahih Muslim, Sunan Abu Dawood, Al-Sunan al-Sughra, Jami` at-Tirmidhi and the aforementioned Sunan Ibn Majah. Despite their importance to the Muslim faith, no one had undertaken such a task prior to his work, and there was no way to search any of these books based on key words or important terms. Ibn al-Qaisarani was also noted for his work in bibliographic indexing and biographical dictionaries, fields in which he is considered an important early figure.

It was also due to Ibn al-Qaisarani's indexing efforts that Ibn Majah's collection was allotted the same respect as the other five main canonical Sunni works. Prior to Ibn al-Qaisarani's inclusion of Ibn Majah's collection in his indexing of the Sunni cannon, major hadith scholars such as Ibn al-Salah didn't actually hold Ibn Majah's work in the high esteem it would later enjoy. Ibn al-Qaisarani's index was also the first instance of formally organizing the Sunni cannon based around specific books of hadith. Given that his index predates Ali ibn al-Athir's The Complete History and Abd al-Ghani al-Maqdisi's Al-Kamal fi Asma' al-Rijal by at least a century, modern scholarship has credited Ibn al-Qaisarani with the establishment of the foundation for the Sunni Muslim cannon.

Ibn al-Qaisarani was a Zahirite, or literalist, in terms of Muslim jurisprudence. Having also been a practitioner of Sufism, Ibn al-Qaisarani wrote about the subject in both prose and poetry. He was criticized by theologians for his defense of Islamic music and dancing, which his detractors alleged were the precursors to Sufi whirling. Despite the respect accorded Ibn al-Qaisarani as a historian and traditionist, he was often criticized for the many grammatical errors in his books as well.

Edited works
 Homonyma inter nomina relativa. Trns. Peter De Jong. Lugduni Batavorum, 1865. Latin. OCLC 715731207

Original works
 Al-Mu'talif wa-l-mukhtalaf fi-l-ansab. Dar al-Kotb al-Ilmieh, 1991. Arabic. 225 pages. Amazon Standard Identification Number B004C2LSEO

See also
 Al-Mustazhir, Abbasid Caliph in Baghdad 1094 – 1118.
 Al-Ghazali, prominent and influential Muslim philosopher, theologian, jurist of Islam.

Citations

Arab biographers
Hadith compilers
Hadith scholars
11th-century Muslim scholars of Islam
Sunni Muslim scholars of Islam
Zahiris
1050s births
1113 deaths
11th-century jurists
12th-century jurists